Patrice de La Tour du Pin (16 March 1911, Paris – 28 October 1975, ibid) was a French writer and poet. He was the winner of the Grand prix catholique de littérature in 1971 for Une Lutte pour la vie.

Works 
 "D'un aventurier". Poème, dans la revue Mirages, Tunis. 1934.
 L'Enfer. Tunis, Cahiers de Barbarie, n° 7, 1ère série, 1935, 80p. Reprint with lithographs by Elie Grekoff, Paris, Éditions de Cluny, 1949
 Le Lucernaire. Tunis, Cahiers de Barbarie, n° 13, 2ème série, 1936, 82 pp.
 Les Anges. Tunis, éd. Monomotapa, 1939.  
 Psaumes, Paris, Éditions Gallimard, 1938, 
 La Quête de joie, Gallimard, 1939  - Prix Mallarmé (which the author declined)
 Une somme de poésie, Gallimard, 1946, .
 La Contemplation errante, Gallimard, 1948, 
 Le Second Jeu (Une somme de poésie, II), Gallimard, 1959, 
 Petit théâtre crépusculaire (Une somme de poésie, III), Gallimard, 1963, 
 Petite somme de poésie, Gallimard, 1967, 
 Une lutte pour la vie, Gallimard, 1970, Grand prix catholique de littérature 1971
 Psaumes de tous mes temps, Gallimard, 1974, 
 Une somme de poésie, Gallimard, 1981:
 Tome I   : Le Jeu de l'homme en lui-même, 
 Tome II  : Le Jeu de l'homme devant les autres, 1982, 
 Tome III : Le Jeu de l'homme devant Dieu, 1983,

External links 
 Société des Amis de Patrice de La Tour du Pin
 Article qui retrace le parcours de Patrice de La Tour du Pin
 Patrice de La Tour du Pin on La Croix
 Patrice de La Tour du Pin on Éditions Gallimard

References 

1911 births
Writers from Paris
1975 deaths
20th-century French writers
French Roman Catholic writers
20th-century French poets
Liturgists
Lycée Janson-de-Sailly alumni
Sciences Po alumni